Levana Moshon (also , Levana Moshon-Kozak) (born October 28, 1952, Tel Aviv) is a writer, journalist, teacher and children's storyteller. She is an author of over 40 books of prose for children and young adults, and several novels for adults.

Awards and nominations
2022: Prime Minister's Prize for Hebrew Literary Works  (for 2021)
2015: nominated for the Sapir Prize (for 2014) for the adult novel Silence of the Plants ("שתיקת הצמחים") 
2009: ACUM Prize for the manuscript, presented anonymously,  "האם אתה כואב אותי" ("You are Hurting Me" also translated as "Feel my Pains")
2005: ACUM Prize for children's and youth literature  for the 2004 novel "לאבא שלי קוראים ארווין" ("My Father is Called Erwin"), which was republished in 2008 as  מכתבים מגבעת הזבל (Letters from the Garbage Heap) 
1995: Tchernichovsky Prize in Poetry and Prose category, for the book Sour Love (published in 1996)

Personal
She is married and mother of three and is a resident of Giv'at Shmuel.

References

1952 births
Living people
20th-century Israeli women writers
20th-century Israeli writers
Israeli women children's writers